This is a list of the judgments given by the Supreme Court of the United Kingdom in 2010 and statistics associated thereupon. Since the Supreme Court began its work on 1 October 2009, this year was its first full year of operation. In total, 58 cases were heard in 2010.

The table lists judgments made by the court and the opinions of the judges in each case. Judges are treated as having concurred in another's judgment when they either formally attach themselves to the judgment of another or speak only to acknowledge their concurrence with one or more judges. Any judgment which reaches a conclusion which differs from the majority on one or more major points of the appeal has been treated as dissent.

Because every judge in the court is entitled to hand down a judgment, it is not uncommon for 'factions' to be formed who reach the same conclusion in different ways, or for all members of the court to reach the same conclusion in different ways. The table does not reflect this.

Table key

2010 Judgments

Notes

External links
 Supreme Court decided cases, 2010

Supreme Court of the United Kingdom cases
Judgments of the Supreme Court of the United Kingdom
Supreme Court of the United Kingdom